Graeme Norgate is a British video game music composer who has composed music for a variety of video games developed by Rare. His first project at Rare was writing music for the Game Boy game, Donkey Kong Land. He also contributed to the soundtracks of Blast Corps and GoldenEye 007. Norgate was later an employee of Free Radical Design, the company was eventually bought out by Crytek and renamed to Crytek UK; Norgate retained the position of audio director after the company's buyout. Norgate later moved to Deep Silver Dambuster Studios after Crytek closed down Crytek UK.

Originally working at a bank before joining Rare in 1994, Norgate worked on the music of such games as GoldenEye 007 and Blast Corps. A friend of fellow Rare composer Robin Beanland, the two worked on the original soundtrack to Killer Instinct in the 1990s. He also composed music (but was not fully credited)  for other Rareware games such as Diddy Kong Racing, Jet Force Gemini, and Perfect Dark.

Norgate played synthesizer and programmed drums for the bands 'FWNT' and 'The Catch' between 1991 and 1992. He also works under the alias of Virez when remixing, he has remixed several songs for bands such as Sigue Sigue Sputnik, Goteki, Code 64, Seize and Illumina.

Video game soundtracks

References

External links
 
 
 
 Bandcamp store
 Artist profile at OverClocked ReMix
 Timesplitters Music Box

Year of birth unknown
Living people
English composers
English male composers
Musicians from London
People from Chingford
Rare (company) people
Video game composers
Year of birth missing (living people)